Crevalcore is a town and comune in the Metropolitan City of Bologna, Emilia-Romagna, central Italy, near Bologna.

On January 7, 2005 a train crash in Crevalcore killed 17 people.

On May 20, 2012 an earthquake caused severe damage to several buildings in the city center.

People
Marcello Malpighi (1628 - 1694), doctor
Gaetano Lodi (1830 – 1886), a famous artist and ornamentation teacher
Armando Bernabiti (1900 - 1970), architect

See also
Crevalcore train crash